

Buildings and structures

Buildings

 209 – Ghal'eh Dokhtar castle built in Persia by future Sassanid Emperor Ardashir I.
 216 – Baths of Caracalla, Rome, completed.
 224 – Palace of Ardashir built near Ghal'eh Dokhtar by Ardashir I.
 266 – Bishapur city founded by Emperor Shapur I as a capital for the Sassanid Empire
 290s – Diocletian's Palace, Split, completed.
 298–299 – Arch of Galerius in Thessaloniki (Macedonia) built.

See also
Timeline of architecture

References

Architecture